Cross section may refer to:
 Cross section (geometry)
Cross-sectional views in architecture & engineering 3D
Cross section (geology)
 Cross section (electronics)
 Radar cross section, measure of detectability
 Cross section (physics)
Absorption cross section
Nuclear cross section
Neutron cross section
Photoionisation cross section
Gamma ray cross section
 Cross Section (album), 1956 musical album by Billy Taylor

See also 

Cross section (fiber), microscopic view of textile fibers.
Section (fiber bundle), in differential and algebraic geometry and topology, a section of a fiber bundle or sheaf
Cross-sectional data, in statistics, econometrics, and medical research, a data set drawn from a single point in time
Cross-sectional study, a scientific investigation utilizing cross-sectional data
Cross-sectional regression, a particular statistical technique for carrying out a cross-sectional study